The Bangladesh Trade Union Centre (BTUC) (Bānlādēśa ṭrēḍa i'uniẏana kēndra) is a national trade union federation in Bangladesh. It is affiliated internationally with the World Federation of Trade Unions.

History
After a fire in a Keraniganj plastic factory in 2019, where 13 workers died of burns and 19 were heavily injured due to the factory building not having any emergency exits, BTUC General Secretary Wajedul Islam Khan demanded better compensation and government action to force factories to adhere to existing workplace safety standards.

During the COVID-19 pandemic, BTUC organised human chains in front of the National Press Club in Dhaka, demanding rations of food for workers, health protections and the timely payment of wages.

References

National trade union centres of Bangladesh
World Federation of Trade Unions